Zaloora is a village (of over 6,530 chollas) in northern Baramulla district, Jammu and Kashmir (J&K), India, approximately  from Sopore, 10 km from Handwara, 30 km from Kupwara. Zaloora is a valley within the valley, fenced by mountains on three sides and by Lal Kul canal on the other. It is the third largest village of Zaingair besides Dangerpora and Shiva.

Demographics
It has 10 mohallas and approximately 12,000 inhabitants. The village had a sizable population of Hindus, but most left because of the militant uprising of the early 1990s. The name may be derived from "zaal" ("[[spider web"). The shape of the village resembles a cage which is surrounded by forests from three sides and the other side is open occupied by agricultural fields which is like a swamp, not drying up

Facilities
Zaloora market consists of almost 120 shops selling daily consumables including groceries, vegetables and fruits, medicine, timber, and iron.

History
Zaloora's long history allegedly began when the lake that covered Kashmir drained, and settlers moved in. Archeological findings near the hem of the mountains that ring the village seem to confirm that Zaloora was home to fisherman.

During the peak of the Buddhist era in Kashmir, Zaloora is said to have been home to a Bodvihar, sanctifying it as a place of religion and learning. During Badshah's reign, holy man Haji Lolo Reshi Baba Sahib, along with disciples, settled in Zaloora. Legend has it that he went on Haj (pilgrimage) 12 times. 

Late Haji sheikh Muhammad Sulaiman(r.a) was an honour of Zaloora. He was a very respectful person. He is the only founder of jamiet te talaba.

Another great personality of zaloora is Haji Ghulam Qadir Shah,who is above 105 years old.He had visited different places of Kashmir to spread Islam.He was also rukn e jammat of jammat I islami Jammu and Kashmir 

During the reign of Budshah (king of Kashmir during the 14th century), Zaloora got its importance. He turned the direction of the river Pohru through Zaloora in order to serve water scarcity in Zaingair.

Tribes
Local families (tribes) include:peer Mir, Bhat, War, Sheikh, Gianie and Gujjar/bakarwal.

The Lone tribe is based mainly in northern Kashmir, although they gradually diffused throughout the valley. Members live in Zaloora and Sopore. The Baht (meaning "priest" or "scribe" in Sanskrit) are found commonly in states in J&K and elsewhere in India. "Sheikh" (or "Sheik") is an Arabic honorific meaning "elder". The origin of Gujjar/bakarwal peoples in Zaloora is uncertain.It is being said that they came from pakistan.They are now well-settled in Zaloora and speak Gujree. This tribe is classified as "Other Backward Class" (OBC). Ismael kaak is a famous person in the Gujjar/bakarwal tribe. He is near about 130+ years old (witness of the First World War). "Mir" is a title derived from the Arabic title (as "Emir"). It was given to great leaders during ancient times. Among Muslims, "Mir" became a synonym of "sayyid" as meaning a "relative of prophet Muhammad". The Mir family have a separate mahalla called "Mir Mahalla zaloora A".
Other mohallas are chaay mohallah,Baigh mohallah,khanday mohallah,etc.

Education
Zaloora is one of the most literate villages in Baramulla District. Several mohallas conducted programmes to boost literacy rates and were key to that achievement.

The village has one higher secondary(Govt Higher Secondary School Zaloora),two high schools, one government-run, the other privately owned i.e. Islamia Model school Zaloora(the 4th oldest FAT school in kashmir) etc., four middle schools, five primary schools and was the first higher-educational village in Baramulla.

Sports
Cricket is the main supporting activity besides volleyball, football, kho kho, kabadi, gilli danda. One more special game played by the children of Zalooora is Brazz.
Batbagh is the famous playground (200 kanals).

Professions
The village is home to a range of professionals such as IT workers, engineers, lecturers, and professors. The fruit business and walnut business are also important in Zaloora.

Cities and towns in Baramulla district
Geography of Jammu and Kashmir